Michael Fowler (born 1956) is a British rock climber, ice climber, mountaineer, and climbing author.

Fowler was voted the "Mountaineers' Mountaineer" in a poll in The Observer, and with Paul Ramsden, won the 2002 Piolet d'Or (or Golden Ice Axe) awards for their ascent of  Mount Siguniang in the Qionglai Mountains in the Sichuan Province of China. In 2012, he was awarded the King Albert award for his "outstanding contribution to mountaineering", and in 2013, he and Paul Ramsden became the first pair to win a Piolet d'Or award twice after their ascent of the  Prow of Shiva in the Indian Himalayas. Paul Ramsden and Mick Fowler received the Piolet d’Or for the third time in 2016 for their ascent of Gave Ding, 6,571 meters (Nepal).

Climbing career
Fowler was introduced to rock climbing and mountaineering as a teenager by his widowed father George, who took him to the Alps in 1969 at the age of 13. In the 1980s, he was regarded as the driving force behind a group of London climbers who would regularly drive to the north of Scotland, a round trip of 1,300 miles, for winter weekends. His record was 11 consecutive weekends.

He was one of the first people to rock climb at the E6 grade of difficulty (Linden Route, Eliminates Wall, Curbar Edge; 1976) and winter climb at grade VI (Central Icefall Direct, Craig y Rhaeadr, Llanberis Pass; 1979). He is widely recognized as a pioneer of adventurous rock climbs on sea cliffs and sea stacks, and for the use of ice-climbing techniques on the soft chalk cliffs of England's southeast coast.

Other climbing

Fowler served as president of the Alpine Club from 2011 to 2013 after winning the first contested election in the organization's 150-year history.

Fowler wrote two volumes of memoirs, both of which were shortlisted for the Boardman Tasker Prize for Mountain Literature. He won the Jon Whyte Award for Mountain Literature at the 2005 Banff Mountain Book Festival and the best book prize at the Bormio Mountain Festival (in Italy) in 2012.

Personal life

Since 1977, Fowler worked full-time for HM Revenue and Customs, where he holds the position of Assistant Director, Shares and Assets Valuation. Since 2008, he has also worked with the outdoor company Berghaus.

Fowler lives in Derbyshire with his wife Nicola and their two children, Tessa and Alec.

Notable ascents

Rock climbing

Single pitch
 Linden (E6) in 1976 at Curbar Edge in Derbyshire (as one of the first E6 climbs in Britain this received extensive press coverage)
 Stone (E5) in the Hebrides
 Ludwig (E6) at Gogarth
 Stairway to Heaven (E5) on Skye
 Caveman (E6) in Devon

Sea cliffs
 Henna (450 ft, XS) and Bukator (600 ft, XS) on the North Devon/Cornwall coast
 Monster Crack (500 ft, XS) (first free ascent of the chalk cliffs at Beachy Head)
 Skeleton Ridge (HVS) on the Isle of Wight
 Clo Mhor Crack (E3) (the only route on the biggest cliffs in mainland Britain, at Cape Wrath in Scotland)
 BeriBeri (E4), on the Isle of Hoy
 Big John (E4), on Hoy (the first one-day ascent of the biggest sea cliff in Britain)
 Great White Fright (VI), Dover

Also includes the following sea stacks:
 Branaunmore (Ireland)
 Lovers Leap Rock (Ireland)
 Doonbristy (Ireland)
 The Needle (Hoy)
 Spindle (Shetland)
 Clett Rock (Thurso)
 Old Harry, The Tusk and Press Gang Pinnacle (Swanage) 
 The Knee (Duncansby Head)

Ice climbing
 The Fly Direct (VI) on Creag Meagaidh
 Gully of the Gods (V) in Applecross
 The Shield Direct (VI) on Ben Nevis (the first Scottish winter route to be given a guidebook rating of VI)
 West Central Gully (VII) Torridon
 Deep Gash Gully (VI) on Skye
 Cascade (V) and Central Ice-fall Direct (VI on Craig Rhaeddr, North Wales)
 A  ice streak created by a leaking toilet outflow at St. Pancras station

Mountaineering
 1982 Taulliraju (Peru), South Face, with Chris Watts
 1983 Killimanjaro, Western Gully, with Caradog Jones
 1986 West Face Direct of Ushba (Caucasus Mountains) with Victor Saunders
 1987 Golden Pillar of Spantik (Pakistan) with Victor Saunders
 1991 Hunza Peak and Bublimoting (Pakistan) with Caradog Jones
 1993 NW Face Kishtwar Kailash (India) with Steve Sustad
 1995 Taweche (Nepal), NE Pillar, with Pat Littlejohn
 1997 North Face of Changabang in the Garhwal Himalaya of Uttarakhand, India. First Ascent with Brendan Murphy and Andy Cave (summit); with Fowler and Steve Sustad climbing to the summit ridge. Murphy was hit by an avalanche and swept off the face to his death on the descent.
 1999 Arwa Tower (India), NW Face, with Steve Sustad
 2000 Mount Kennedy (Yukon), N Buttress, with Andy Cave
 2002 Mount Siguniang (Sichuan), NW Face, with Paul Ramsden
 2005 Kajaqiao (Tibet), with Chris Watts
 2007 Manamcho (Tibet) with Paul Ramsden
 2010 Sulamar North Face (Xinjiang) with Paul Ramsden
 2011 Mugu Chuli West Face (West Nepal) with Dave Turnbull
 2012 Prow of Shiva (India) with Paul Ramsden
 2013 Kishtwar Kailash West Face (India) with Paul Ramsden
 2014 NW Face Hagshu (India) with Paul Ramsden
 2016 North Face of Sersank (India) with Victor Saunders

Awards
King Albert Mountain Award, 2012

Bibliography

References

External links
Mick Fowler's climbing profile on Climbandmore.com
Information about Mick's Sponsors Berghaus
king-albert-foundation.ch

1956 births
Living people
English mountain climbers
British rock climbers
People from Melbourne, Derbyshire
Sportspeople from Derbyshire
Presidents of the Alpine Club (UK)
Sportspeople from London
Ice climbers
Piolet d'Or winners